Boort railway station is a closed and unused railway station located on the Robinvale railway line at Boort, Victoria Australia. There are currently no passenger services to the station, though is generally passed by freight trains up to here and Quambatook.

Disused railway stations in Victoria (Australia)